Jose Luis Lobato Campos (5 October 1938 – 17 October 2014) was a Mexican politician affiliated with the Convergence. He served as Senator of the LX and LXI Legislatures of the Mexican Congress representing Veracruz.

On  October 17, 2014, Lobato and his wife, Olga Borguetti, were shot to death by Lobato's son, José Luis Lobato Calderón, who later attempted to commit suicide.

References

1938 births
2014 deaths
Politicians from Veracruz
Members of the Senate of the Republic (Mexico)
Citizens' Movement (Mexico) politicians
Assassinated Mexican politicians
Deaths by firearm in Mexico
21st-century Mexican politicians
Patricides